Jack Senior (born 18 July 1988) is an English professional golfer who plays on the European Tour. He has won twice on the Challenge Tour.

Amateur career
Senior won the Egyptian Amateur in 2010 and the New South Wales Amateur and  Lytham Trophy in 2011. He played on the winning Great Britain & Ireland team in the 2011 Walker Cup and turned professional shortly after.

Professional career
Senior has played on the Alps Tour and the PGA EuroPro Tour. He won twice on the Alps Tour in 2012 and twice on the PGA EuroPro Tour in 2014.

From 2012 to 2019 Senior played primarily on the Challenge Tour. He won his first Challenge Tour event in 2015 at the SSE Scottish Hydro Challenge. He beat Robert Coles and Prom Meesawat with a birdie at the fourth hole of a sudden-death playoff. He won for the second time on the tour at the 2019 ISPS Handa World Invitational beating Matthew Baldwin at the second hole of the playoff. He was also runner-up in the Lalla Aïcha Challenge Tour and finished the 2019 season 6th in the Challenge Tour Order of Merit to earn a place on the 2020 European Tour.

Amateur wins
2010 South of England Amateur, Egyptian Amateur Open
2011 New South Wales Amateur, Lytham Trophy, Hampshire Hog

Sources:

Professional wins (6)

Challenge Tour wins (2)

Challenge Tour playoff record (2–0)

PGA EuroPro Tour wins (2)

Alps Tour wins (2)

Results in major championships

CUT = missed the half-way cut
"T" = Tied
NT = No tournament due to COVID-19 pandemic
Note: Senior only played in The Open Championship.

Team appearances
Amateur
Walker Cup (representing Great Britain & Ireland): 2011 (winners)
European Amateur Team Championship (representing England): 2011

See also
2019 Challenge Tour graduates

References

External links

English male golfers
European Tour golfers
Sportspeople from Morecambe
1988 births
Living people